Pine Island is an unincorporated community and census-designated place (CDP) in Hernando County, Florida, United States. The population was 64 at the 2010 census, unchanged from the 2000 census.

Geography
It forms the northern edge of Rock Island Bay, which lies between Pine Island and Bayport.

Pine Island Park (also known as Alfred McKethan Park) is a  area on the Gulf of Mexico at 10800 Pine Island Drive that includes a swimming beach and swimming area, picnic tables, shelters, barbecue grills, observation point, volleyball court, playground and concession stand.

Demographics

As of the census of 2000, there were 64 people, 16 households, and 20 families residing in the CDP. The racial makeup of the CDP was 87.50% White, 9.38% African-American, 1.56% Pacific Islander, and 1.56% from two or more races. Hispanic or Latino of any race were 1.56% of the population.

There were 29 households, out of which 20.7% had children under the age of 18 living with them, 48.3% were married couples living together, 20.7% had a female householder with no husband present, and 31.0% were non-families. 24.1% of all households were made up of individuals, and 3.4% had someone living alone who was 65 years of age or older. The average household size was 2.21 and the average family size was 2.50.

In the CDP, the population was spread out, with 15.6% under the age of 18, 9.4% from 18 to 24, 23.4% from 25 to 44, 34.4% from 45 to 64, and 17.2% who were 65 years of age or older. The median age was 46 years. For every 100 females, there were 93.9 males. For every 100 females age 18 and over, there were 80.0 males.

The median income for a household in the CDP was $40,000, and the median income for a family was $42,708. Males had a median income of $0 versus $0 for females. The per capita income for the CDP was $17,927. There were no families and 20.0% of the population living below the poverty line, including no under eighteens and 25.0% of those over 64.

References

External links

Census-designated places in Hernando County, Florida
Beaches of Florida
Populated coastal places in Florida on the Gulf of Mexico
Beaches of Hernando County, Florida
Unincorporated communities in Florida